
Year 56 BC was a year of the pre-Julian Roman calendar. In the Roman Republic, it was known as the Year of the Consulship of Lentulus and Philippus (or, less frequently, year 698 Ab urbe condita). The denomination 56 BC for this year has been used since the early medieval period, when the Anno Domini calendar era became the prevalent method in Europe for naming years.

Events 
 By place 

 Roman Republic 
 Roman Consuls are Gnaeus Cornelius Lentulus Marcellinus and Lucius Marcius Philippus.
 Clodia accuses her former lover Marcus Caelius Rufus of trying to poison her. The trial ends with the defendant acquitted thanks to the Pro Caelio speech of Cicero. There is no more reference to the formerly well-known Clodia.
 Third year of Julius Caesar's Gallic Wars: 
 Decimus Junius Brutus Albinus , one of Caesar's subordinates, defeats the Veneti of Brittany: The Gauls lose most of their warships to the Romans in a sea battle at modern-day Quiberon Bay. The strongholds on the coast are stormed, and the population is slaughtered or sold into slavery.
 Autumn – Julius Caesar leads an attack on the Morini and the Menapii tribes of the Belgae on the North Sea. They withdraw into their forests, creating difficulties for Caesar's supply lines. The onset of bad weather forces him to pull back into Gallia Belgica.

 Britain 
 This year, or possibly the following year, the king of the Trinovantes called Imanuentius, is overthrown and killed by his rival Cassivellaunus. His son Mandubracius flees to Gaul and appeals to Julius Caesar for help.

Births

Deaths 
 Lucius Licinius Lucullus, Roman politician (b. 118 BC)
Philip II Philoromaeus, king of the Seleucid Empire (approximate date)
Imanuentius, the king of the Trinovantes (a kingdom in  Pre-Roman Britain)

References